Kabirwala  (Punjabi ), is a town of Khanewal District in the Punjab province of Pakistan. The town is the headquarters of Kabirwala Tehsil, an administrative subdivision of the district. Kabirwala was 118th biggest city, with a population of over 684,000 residents, according to the 1998 Population Census of Pakistan, which is estimated at a million in 2017 by the Pakistan Population Census 2017.

Location 
Kabirwala is in Punjab, Pakistan. Its geographical coordinates are 30°20'10" North, 70°43'30" East. It is one of four tehsils in Khanewal District. Kabirwala lies 10 km north of the district capital Khanewal on the Multan-Jhang road. Kabirwala is a city north 40 km from Multan City.

History 
The city is named Kabirwala after Baba Pir Kabir[3], who lived in the area. Kabirwala was part of Multan until restructuring made the largest sub division of Khanewal district. Sirai Sidhu, a historic city, used to be the tehsil headquarters of the whole district Khanewal, before 1937.
During British rule,
The population in 1901 was 130,507 compared with 113,412 in 1891. It then contained the town of Tulamba (population in 1901 – 2526) and 320 villages, including Kabirwala, the headquarters. The land revenue and cesses in 1913-4 amounted to 520,000. The Ravi runs through the northern portion of the tehsil to its junction with the Chenab in the north-west corner. The north and west portions were irrigated by the Sidhnai Canal, while the south consisted of uncultivated Bar Jungle.

During the period of British rule it existed as a sub-division of the Multan district and had an annual revenue of over half a million Rupees.

Religion and culture 
The Kabirwala area is a land of diverse religions and culture. Along with the tombs of Muslim Sufi saints, there are also Hindu places of worship. The Kabirwala city being the seat of baba pir Kabir, the historic tomb of Khalid Walid, in Mauza Khati Chore along Multan – Sarai Sidhu Road, 24 km to the west of Kabirwala city is located. The tomb of the saint Abdul Hakim is also located in this area in a sub tehsil city of Abdul Hakim. The tomb of the saint Ali Sher Bhutta Naqshbandi is also located in this city. The mausoleum was built very recently and it is built on the site where Ali Sher used to meet his disciples and help people, both locals and further afield.

Kabirwala city is also the seat of largest Shia community,accounting more than 79% population comprises Shia Muslims . However, there are also Sunnis (Deobandis,bralevis) and ahl e hadis being the part of Muslim community in Kabirwala

Besides being a centre for Islamic education, Kabirwala is also has two Hindu Shamshan Ghaats (places of burning the Hindu dead), Ram Chotra and Lachman Chotra, along the bank of Ravi river. There is a Mandir (Hindu temple) in Sarai Sidhu, a sub-town of Kabirwala. Likewise, the Sikh Gurudwara called Pehli Patshahi is located in the Makhdoompur sub-town, 12 km from Kabirwala.

Production, processing and trade 
Nestle has chosen Kabirwala as the site for its largest Asian milk processing plant, on the same road, having purchased the Kabirwala Dairy Limited in the 1990s. Reportedly, the plant has a processing capacity of two million liters of milk a day, which is set to rise to three million in the near future. Nestle, through the network of its milk collection centers spread all over the Punjab province, collects milk from 140,000 farmers.

Communication and transport 

Kabirwala is located at the crossroads of several important routes. It links south with north of Pakistan. All the transport from the Sindh province, Dera Ghazi Khan, Muzaffar Garh, Rahim Yar Khan, Bahawalpur, Multan and Khanewal districts traveling to the capital of Pakistan, Islamabad, has to pass through Kabirwala to connect to Jhang and Sargodha. There are two bus stands, the old one is located at the western edge of the city along the Multan Road, and the new one is located on the southern edge of the city along the Khanewal Road. Apart from the offices of bus companies, these bus stands also house offices of trucking and cargo companies.

Notable people
 Sarv Mittra Sikri, the Chief Justice of India who was born, lived here and was practicing as at Lahore High Court.
 Har Gobind Khorana, the joint winner of the Nobel Prize for Medicine (1968) was born here in 1922.
 Fakhar Imam, was the 11th Speaker of the National Assembly of Pakistan.

References 

Populated places in Khanewal District
History of Pakistan
Madrasas in Pakistan